Clarita de Quiroz (born 3 August 1987) is a Scottish singer–songwriter and model from Edzell, Angus, Scotland. De Quiroz is a classically trained pianist and percussionist, who was named north-east Scotland's "Young Musician of the Year" in 1998. In August 2008, De Quiroz appeared in the video for MC Harvey's  "If I Was Your Man", the shooting of which was interrupted by Fife Police, as it was taking place close to the home of Prime Minister Gordon Brown. Her first single, "Summertime", was released in September 2008. She is also known for supporting Akon in Scotland during 2007 as well as Amp Fiddler. De Quiroz is now based in the UAE.

De Quiroz filmed for the first motion picture in Dubai, City of Life.  De Quiroz is also one of the Michelle Mone Ultimo's package models (website demonstration model) alongside ex Miss Scotland Lois Weatherup.

Career

Modelling
De Quiroz was signed to numerous agencies.  She was first signed with Scotland's The Look Agency (now The Look at Colours Agency). Her Dubai agency is Bareface for modelling.

De Quiroz is currently based in Dubai where she has modelled for, MAC Makeup, Guerlain Makeup UAE, Snob magazine, Physique magazine, Illustrado magazine, Liz Claiborne UAE, Sheraton Hotels, Lily Pond Spa, Galeries Lafayette, Crafft AC (Commercial), Dubai Tourism Global Commercial, Men's Fitness Magazine, Harvey Nichols, Abu Dhabi Sports TV, Dessert Fish Magazine, and Emirates Woman Magazine.  De Quiroz was also a selected finalist for the Paris Hilton BFF Dubai 2009 show however rejected the opportunity.

Clarita became the face of Val Saint Lambert in October 2009 and shot for the new campaign in Belgium.

De Quiroz was a packaging model for Ultimo lingerie alongside Lois Weatherup, a former Miss Scotland.  She has modelled for companies such as La Senza, Boudich Lingerie, La Sirenne Channel 4 Stacked, ICS learning commercial, front page model and editorial model for Illustrado Magazine La Femme Fatale Lingerie, Wella Hair at Salon International 2007, MTV, and appeared on numerous front page covers of magazines and editorials/commercials.

Music
De Quiroz is a classically trained pianist and percussionist, who was named north-east Scotland's "Young Musician of the Year" in 1998.

Clarita supported Sir Elton John at his Abu Dhabi Yas Arena performance in March 2012 as well as won the GR8! Women Awards 2012 for Best Singer in the Middle East.

Clarita performed at the Formula 1 Abu Dhabi 2011 just after her performance alongside Macy Gray in Doha for the Doha 21st Century Leaders Awards 2011 in October. Clarita de Quiroz also performed at the 2010 Formula 1 supporting Kelly Rowland, Gabrielle and the Sugababes.

De Quiroz was elected one of the UAE's Hot 100 for Ahlan Magazine UAE, where she performed during the night before Jermaine Jackson and accompanied Sheila Ferguson from Three Degrees on the piano.

De Quiroz completed her "Grade 8 Piano" at the age of 16 and her "Grade 8 Percussion" at 15 at the Associated Board of the Royal Schools of Music. De Quiroz composed her first concerto Inamorato at the age of 15 during her lunch time breaks during school. She started her vocal training at the age of 13.

De Quiroz has been featured on BBC Radio 1Xtra, BBC One, BBC Scotland, and supported Akon, Amp Fiddler, and Martin Luther (Roots).

Her performances in Dubai have included the Grazia Style Awards 2009, Time Out Awards and Esquire Magazine Launch 2009, Arabian Business Awards and Emirates Woman of the Year Awards 2009.  In October 2009 Clarita performed in front of the Qatar Al Thani Royal Family for the Doha 21st Century Leaders Awards 2009.

She released her first Single "Summertime" in 2008 which featured Pharrell Williams's girls Kin 4 Life and HBO Latino's La Bruja.  The double single release also contained Hypnotize featuring Flipmode Squad's Baby Sham and Kanye West's JNan.

Presenting
De Quiroz started shooting for City 7 TV's Dubai Dine TV and Dubai Night's TV shows in June 2010.

Personal life
De Quiroz was one of the six Women of Substance 2009 for the UAE for Illustrado She plans to expand on her charity work this year to build schools in the Philippines.

She is a big fan of Paulo Coehlo and Kahlil Gibran's writing and shares the similar spiritual beliefs.

References

External links

1984 births
Living people
Scottish expatriates in the United Arab Emirates
Emirati people of Scottish descent
Emirati people of Portuguese descent
Scottish female models
21st-century Scottish women singers
Scottish singer-songwriters
People from Abu Dhabi
Musicians from Dorset